Adipicola is a genus of saltwater clams, marine bivalve molluscs in the family Mytilidae, the mussels.

Species 
The World Register of Marine Species lists the following species:

 Adipicola apenninica Danise, Bertolaso & Dominici, 2016 †
 Adipicola chikubetsuensis (Amano, 1984) †
 Adipicola crypta (Dall, Bartsch & Rehder, 1938)
 Adipicola dubia (Prashad, 1932)
 Adipicola iwaotakii (Habe, 1958)
 Adipicola leticiae Signorelli & Crespo, 2017
 Adipicola longissima (Thiele, 1931)
 Adipicola osseocola Dell, 1987
 Adipicola pacifica (Dall, Bartsch & Rehder, 1938)
 Adipicola pelagica (Forbes in Woodward, 1854)
 Adipicola projecta (Verco, 1908)
 Adipicola simpsoni  (Marshall, 1900) is now accepted as Idas simpsoni (J. T. Marshall, 1900)

According to NCBI:
 Adipicola arcuatilis
 Adipicola crypta
 Adipicola iwaotakii
 Adipicola longissima
 Adipicola pacifica

References

Mytilidae
Bivalve genera